Arrigo Breschi was an Italian set decorator. He was nominated for an Academy Award in the category Best Art Direction for the film It Started in Naples (1960) which starred Clark Gable, Sophia Loren, and Vittorio De Sica.

Selected filmography
 I, Hamlet (1952)
 It Started in Naples (1960)

References

External links

Year of birth missing
Possibly living people
Italian set decorators
20th-century Italian people